Elisabeth McDonald  is a New Zealand feminist law academic. She is currently full professor at the University of Canterbury.

Academic career
McDonald began a BLaws at Victoria University of Wellington in 1985, followed by an MLaws at the University of Michigan. Returning to Victoria, she was appointed to staff, rising to senior lecturer in 1995 and associate professor in 2005. After 27 years at Victoria she moved to the University of Canterbury as full professor in 2017.

McDonald's research interests include the law of evidence, law and sexuality and feminist legal theory.

In the 2018 Queen's Birthday Honours, McDonald was appointed a Member of the New Zealand Order of Merit, for services to the law and education.

Personal life

McDonald had a son in 1990, a daughter in 1991 and is married to Wayne Johnson, who owns a construction business.

Selected works 
 McDonald, Elisabeth, and Yvette Tinsley, eds. From "Real Rape" to Real Justice: Prosecuting Rape in New Zealand. Victoria University Press, 2011.
 McDonald, Elisabeth. "Gender bias and the law of evidence: The link between sexuality and credibility." Victoria U. Wellington L. Rev. 24 (1994): 175.
 Mahoney, Richard, Elisabeth McDonald, Scott Optican, and Yvette Tinsley. The Evidence Act 2006: Act & Analysis. Thomson Reuters, 2010.
 McDonald, Elisabeth. "'Real Rape'in New Zealand: Women Complainants' Experience of the Court Process." (1997).
 McDonald, Elisabeth. "Provocation, sexuality and the actions of'thoroughly decent men'." Women's Studies Journal 9, no. 2 (1993): 126.
 McDonald, Elisabeth. "No straight answer: Homophobia as both an aggravating and mitigating factor in New Zealand homicide cases." Victoria U. Wellington L. Rev. 37 (2006): 223.

References

External links
 
 
 institutional homepage

New Zealand women academics
New Zealand feminists
University of Michigan Law School alumni
Victoria University of Wellington alumni
Academic staff of the Victoria University of Wellington
Academic staff of the University of Canterbury
Living people
Year of birth missing (living people)
Members of the New Zealand Order of Merit